Govt. Girls' High School, Rayagada is a 50-year-old institution located at Rayagada, Odisha, India.
The school maintains an ECO-CLUB headed by B. Sarala( Asst. Teacher).

History
The High school was established in the year 1964. It is one among the 17 recognized high schools of Rayagada district.

References

See also
Board of Secondary Education, Odisha
List of schools in India
Rayagada

Girls' schools in Odisha
Education in Rayagada district
Educational institutions established in 1964
1964 establishments in Orissa